Molla Shahab ol Din (also Romanized as Mollā Shahāb ol Dīn, Mollā Shahāb ed Dīn, and Mollā Shahāb od Dīn) is a village in Zarrineh Rud-e Shomali Rural District, in the Central District of Miandoab County, West Azerbaijan Province, Iran. At the 2006 census, its population was 2,311, in 490 families; and 3,445 in about 720 families at the 2016.

References 

Populated places in Miandoab County